Sueños de Cabaret (English Cabaret Dreams) is the second cover album by Mexican pop singer Daniela Romo after 1994's La Cita. It was released in 2008.

History
The album was produced by Guillermo Gil. With the use of her great voice and interpretive mastery Daniela presents 11 contemporary themes carried to the atmosphere of the fifties that are decked with the sound of the orchestra and the sensual sound of the cabaret.

Track listing
Tracks:
 Abuso
 Mía
 Intocable
 Tú de que vas
 Qué manera de quererte
 Mi credo
 No Podrás
 Mujer contra mujer
 Color Esperanza
 Víveme
 Pensar en ti

Covered Singers
 Pedro Infante
 Aleks Syntek
 Franco De Vita
 Gilberto Santa Rosa
 Pepe Aguilar
 Cristian Castro
 Mecano
 Diego Torres
 Laura Pausini
 Luis Miguel

Credits
 Juan Barbosa → Production Assistant
 Agustin Bernal → Double Bass
 Beto Dominguez → Guitar, Percussion, Percussion Arrangement
 Moisés Garcia → Trumpet
 Güicho Gil → Mastering
 Guillermo Gil → Producer
 Memo Gil → Guitar, Mixing, Percussion Arrangement, Recording
 Héctor Martínez → Concept, A&R
 Tono Peregrino → Chorus
 Raul Rodrigo → Graphic Design
 Paco Rosas → Guitar (Electric)
 Pancho Ruiz → Producer, Chorus
 Abel Sanchez → Sax (Alto)
 Uriel Santana → Photography
 Mario Santos → Piano, Arranger, Producer

References

2008 albums
Daniela Romo albums